Leonardo Bonatini Lohner Maia (born 28 March 1994) is a Brazilian professional footballer who plays as a forward for Liga MX club Atlético San Luis.

Club career

Cruzeiro
Born in Belo Horizonte, Minas Gerais, Bonatini joined Cruzeiro's youth setup in 2010, aged 16. In July 2012 he was loaned to Italian Serie A club Juventus for one season, with a buyout clause.

Bonatini only appeared for the club's Primavera squad, and subsequently returned to Cruzeiro in the 2013 summer. On 2 October 2013 he moved to Goiás, also in a temporary deal until the end of the year.

Bonatini made his professional – and Série A – debut on 27 October, coming on as a second-half substitute in a 2–0 away win against Náutico. He appeared in five further matches for Esmeraldino during the campaign, and had his loan contract renewed for a further year on 7 January 2014.

On 5 August 2014, Bonatini's loan was cut short, due to the lack of opportunities in the main squad.

Estoril
On 5 January 2015, he was loaned to Primeira Liga side Estoril Praia, until June.

On 13 July 2015, Bonatini had 50% of his federative rights sold to Traffic Group, remaining at Estoril permanently. On 27 February 2016, he scored a hat-trick in a 3–0 home win against Vitória de Setúbal. He finished the season with 17 goals as the Canarinhos finished 8th, with only Jonas, Islam Slimani and Kostas Mitroglou scoring more in the entire league.

Al-Hilal
On 16 July 2016, Bonatini joined Saudi club Al-Hilal. He won the Saudi Professional League in his only season in Riyadh, with him and compatriot Carlos Eduardo scoring 12 goals each. The team also won the 2017 King Cup, and Bonatini scored twice in the 3–2 win over Al-Wehda in the last 16 at the Prince Faisal bin Fahd Stadium.

Wolverhampton Wanderers
On 1 August 2017, Bonatini was sent on a season-long loan to Championship side Wolverhampton Wanderers. Four days later, he made his debut, and scored his first goal, in a 1–0 win against Middlesbrough at Molineux Stadium. He scored his 10th goal of the season on 3 November 2017 in a 2–0 win against Fulham, scoring in six consecutive games, becoming the first player of the 2017–18 EFL Championship season to reach double figures. On 10 November 2017, after scoring 5 goals in 4 games during the October fixtures, he was awarded with the EFL Championship Player of the Month. 
Despite scoring his last goal of the season on 4 December 2017, Bonatini finished as Wolves' second top scorer with 12 goals in 43 games as the club gained promotion to the Premier League, as well as winning the Championship league title.

On 30 June 2018, he joined Wolves on a permanent deal, signing a four-year-contract for an undisclosed fee. However, he took little part in their top-flight campaign, having fallen behind other strikers such as Raúl Jiménez at Nuno Espírito Santo's club.

On 31 January 2019, Bonatini joined Championship side Nottingham Forest on loan until the end of the season. He debuted two days later in a 2–0 loss at Birmingham City, replacing Daryl Murphy after an hour. Bonatini made only four more appearances for the Reds – two starts – and did not score.

Bonatini returned to Portugal's top flight on 30 August 2019, signing a season-long loan for Vitória SC.

On 22 September 2020 he agreed a two-year-long loan deal at Swiss side Grasshopper, playing in the Swiss Challenge League. With 11 goals shot in 31 games, the highest scorer for Grasshopper, he was instrumental in helping them achieve promotion to the Swiss Super League. In his second year at Grasshopper, he played a further 26 matches and shot seven goals (second highest in the team) and helped the team remain in the top Swiss league. After a total of 20 goals scored in 59 matches, he returned to back to Wolves at the end of May 2022.

Atlético San Luis
On December 1, 2022, Wolves announced that that Bonatini had left the club by mutual consent after 4 years. On January 1 2023, he joined Atlético San Luis on a two-and-a-half year deal on a free transfer.

Career statistics

Club

Honours
Al Hilal
Saudi Professional League: 2016–17
King Cup: 2017

Wolverhampton Wanderers
EFL Championship: 2017–18

Grasshoppers
Swiss Challenge League: 2020–21

Individual
EFL Championship Player of the Month: October 2017
PFA Fans' Championship Player of the Month: October 2017

References

External links

1994 births
Living people
Footballers from Belo Horizonte
Brazilian footballers
Brazil youth international footballers
Association football forwards
Cruzeiro Esporte Clube players
Goiás Esporte Clube players
Primeira Liga players
G.D. Estoril Praia players
Al Hilal SFC players
Wolverhampton Wanderers F.C. players
Nottingham Forest F.C. players
Vitória S.C. players
Grasshopper Club Zürich players
Atlético San Luis footballers
Campeonato Brasileiro Série A players
Saudi Professional League players
English Football League players
Premier League players
Swiss Challenge League players

Brazilian expatriate footballers
Brazilian expatriate sportspeople in Portugal
Brazilian expatriate sportspeople in Saudi Arabia
Brazilian expatriate sportspeople in England
Brazilian expatriate sportspeople in Switzerland
Brazilian expatriate sportspeople in Mexico
Expatriate footballers in Saudi Arabia
Expatriate footballers in Portugal
Expatriate footballers in England
Expatriate footballers in Switzerland
Expatriate footballers in Mexico